The Inventor is an upcoming stop motion animated biographical film about Leonardo da Vinci, written, produced and directed by Jim Capobianco and co-directed by Pierre-Luc Granjon. The voice cast includes Stephen Fry, Marion Cotillard, Daisy Ridley, and Matt Berry. The Inventor is a co-production between France, Ireland, Luxembourg and the United States. The film is set to be released in 2023.

Plot
The film follows the life of inventor Leonardo da Vinci, who leaves Italy to join the French court, where he can experiment freely.

Voice cast 
 Stephen Fry as Leonardo da Vinci
 Marion Cotillard as Louise of Savoy
 Daisy Ridley as Marguerite
 Matt Berry as Pope Leo X
 Jim Capobianco as Cardinal of Aragon
 Max Baumgarten as Il Boccador / King Charles of Spain
 Ben Stranahan as Page
 John Gilkey as Gravedigger John / Giuliano
 Angelino Sandri as Francesco Melzi
 Daniel Swan as King Henry the VIII

Production

Development 
On 12 April 2018, Variety reported that the Academy Award-nominee screenwriter of Ratatouille (2007), Jim Capobianco, and producer Robert Rippberger were producing The Inventor, a stop-motion adventure film about the life of Leonardo da Vinci, which is a continuation of Capobianco's 2009 short film, Leonardo. On 2 May 2018, Capobianco said in an interview with Flickering Myth that The Inventor would focus on the end of Leonardo da Vinci's life where he moved to France.

On 19 June 2020, Deadline reported that comedian Stephen Fry would voice Leonardo da Vinci, and actress Daisy Ridley would voice French Princess Marguerite. The animation team also includes HeFang Wei as the film's 2D animation director, Tomm Moore as 2D animation consultant, Nicolas Flory as 2D supervisor, and Fabrice Faivre as the VFX supervisor. Alex Mandel composed the score. Shooting was scheduled to start in August 2021 with a release date set for Spring 2023. The film is a European and American coproduction from Foliascope (France), Melusine Productions (Luxembourg), Curiosity Studio (Ireland), and Leo & King (United States). mk2 films is handling the film's international sales, while The Exchange handles sales in the United States.

On 11 September 2020, Variety reported that Marion Cotillard and Matt Berry had joined the cast and would voice Queen Louise of Savoy and Pope Leo X, respectively. On 23 April 2021, it was announced that triple Oscar nominee Tomm Moore had joined the film's creative team and would handle the 2D sequences along with his frequent collaborator Fabian Erlinghäuser. The screenplay was written by Jim Capobianco, who co-directed the film with Pierre-Luc Granjon. The film is an independent production with an estimated budget of $10 million.

In June 2022, a 25-minute footage of the film was screened at the Annecy International Animation Film Festival in France at the festival's work-in-progress section in a sold-out session.

Filming 
Production began on 14 February 2022 at the Foliascope Studio in Saint-Péray in France. On 19 February 2022, composer Alex Mandel wrote on his Twitter account that Marion Cotillard sings one of his songs in The Inventor. On 17 July 2022, French newspaper Le Dauphiné Libéré revealed behind the scenes images from the set. Shooting wrapped on 16 December 2022. The first scoring session with composer Alex Mandel and the Budapest Scoring Orchestra was conducted fully remotely on 16 January 2023.

Release
The film is set to be released in 2023. On 28 April 2022, Variety reported that the film had been pre-sold to several countries, such as France, Portugal, Hong Kong, Taiwan, Philippines, Former Yugoslavia, the U.K., German-speaking Europe, Greece, Italy, Scandinavia, Spain, Switzerland, Turkey, Israel, South Africa, Australia, New Zealand, India, Latin America, the Middle East and Indonesia. It will be released in France by KMBO. A work-in-progress screening of the film was shown at the Anima: Brussels International Animation Film Festival on 24 February 2023.

References

External links 
 
 

Upcoming films
2023 films
2023 animated films
2020s French animated films
2020s American animated films
2020s stop-motion animated films
Biographical films about painters
Animated films based on actual events
English-language French films
Irish animated films
French animated feature films
French independent films
American independent films
Irish independent films
2020s English-language films
3D animated films
Animated films set in Italy
Animated films set in France
Cultural depictions of Leonardo da Vinci